John J. ("J.J.", "little Mac") McDermott (born October 16, 1874) was an Irish-American athlete, born in Manhattan, New York City to James McDermott and Lizzie Grady. He won the first marathon run in the United States in 1896, as well as the inaugural Boston Marathon, then known as the B.A.A. Road Race, in 1897. He was a lithographer by trade.

McDermott lost his mother at the age of eleven. He was unusually frail and light as a youth.

He reportedly died either from consumption (tuberculosis) or from an inherited pulmonary disease sometime before 1906. One source states that he had tuberculosis when he won the Boston Marathon in 1897. The New England Historic Genealogical Society in Boston, Massachusetts has an ongoing search to learn of the burial location of John McDermott. His sister Julia died of tuberculosis in 1905.

Little is known of McDermott's life outside of his running accomplishments.

First American Marathon 
The first marathon race to be held in the United States took place on September 19, 1896, five months after the first Olympic Marathon, as part of the fall meeting of the Knickerbocker Athletic Club of New York City. While regular track and field events were taking place at the Columbia Oval (located in an area that was then part of Williamsbridge but is now called Norwood, in the Bronx borough), twenty-eight athletes, almost all from the New York City area, had earlier traveled by train to Stamford, Connecticut for the marathon race. The course began at the Stamford Armory, and proceeded through Riverside, Cos Cob, Greenwich, Port Chester, Rye, Harrison, Mamaroneck, Larchmont, New Rochelle, East Chester, Woodlawn, and William's Bridge, finishing with two laps on the Columbia Oval.

The roads for the first  were in terrible condition, covered in mud and slush from heavy precipitation that morning. The winning time was twenty-seven minutes slower than the Olympic Marathon time posted by Spiridon Louis five months previously, which was attributed to the difficult conditions under which the race was run. Nineteen athletes completed the race in total.

First Boston Marathon 
McDermott ran the first Boston Marathon on April 19, 1897 with eighteen starters, six from New York. He would lose  over the course of the race.

The initial lead was taken by Hamilton Gray, second in the New York race, and Dick Grant, a Harvard track athlete from St. Mary's, Ontario, Canada. Grant attempted to stay with him, but had to give up when the uphill out of Newton Lower Falls was reached. McDermott continued to extend his lead through the Newton Hills, beginning to combine walking and running at about the  mark at Evergreen Cemetery. After a rubdown from his handler, he proceeded down Beacon Street and Commonwealth Avenue. At Massachusetts Avenue he ran into a funeral procession, stalling two electric cars. He finished with a lap of the Irvington Oval, part of a track and field meet conducted by the Boston Athletic Association. His time was 2:55:10, three minutes and forty seconds faster than Spiridon Louis’ time at the Olympic Games, so it was immediately claimed as a world record. However, there was no standard marathon distance at the time, and no organization to ratify world records.

McDermott had finished the marathon with bloody and blistered feet, his skin peeling off. He stated that this would likely be his last long race. But he returned the next year to defend his title. He was the race favorite. Hamilton Gray and Dick Grant were back as well. However, the race was won by Ronald McDonald, a 22-year-old from Antigonish, Nova Scotia, Canada who was a student at Boston College, in a course record time of 2:42:00, over thirteen minutes faster than McDermott's time from the previous year. McDermott also beat his previous time, finishing in 2:54:17, but finished only fourth.

References

1874 births
1948 deaths
American male long-distance runners
American male marathon runners
Track and field athletes from New York City
Boston Marathon male winners